Coste is a surname. Notable people with the surname include:
Alert V. Coste, Assistant Secretary of the Navy (Financial Management and Comptroller) (January 10, 1993 – December 11, 1993)
Alexandre Coste (born 2003) is the son of Albert II, Prince of Monaco and Nicole Coste
Carlos Coste (born 1976), a free-diver from Venezuela
Charles Coste (born 1924), a French cyclist 
Christian Coste (born 1949), a former professional French footballer
Christopher Robert Coste (born 1973), an author and Major League Baseball catcher
Claudio Di Coste (born 1954), Italian volleyball player
Émile Coste (1862–1927), a French fencer 
Georges Coste (born Perpignan, 1944), a French rugby union coach and former player
Gérard Coste (born 1939), a French painter and diplomat
Jean-Baptiste Coste (1777–1809), a French painter
Joanne Koenig Coste an advocate for patients with Alzheimer's Disease
Jorge Coste (disambiguation), several people
Jules Coste (journalist) (1840–1910)
Louis de La Coste (1675–1750), a French composer
Louise Zoé Coste or Louise Zoé Meynier (1805–?), a French painter
Melanie Coste (born 1976), a French pornographic actress
Michel Saloff Coste (born 1955), a French artist and professor 
Napoléon Coste (1805–1883), a French guitarist and composer
Nicole Coste (born Lomé, 1971), a former Air France flight attendant from Togo
Numa Coste (1843–1907), French painter and journalist.
Paul Coste-Floret (1911–1979), a French politician
Sharon Coste (born 1963), a French soprano of Canadian origin
Xavier Pascal Coste  (1787–1879), a French architect

See also
Conservatoria delle Coste
Coste Rocks Provincial Park
Lacoste
Saint-Paul-la-Coste
Saint-Victor-la-Coste